The Cincinnati Reds are a current Major League Baseball team based in Cincinnati, Ohio, U.S.

Cincinnati Reds may also refer to:
 Cincinnati Red Stockings, the first openly all-professional baseball team, playing in the National Association of Base Ball Players from 1866 to 1870
 Cincinnati Reds (1876–1879), a team that played in the National League from 1876 to 1879. The club was disbanded at the end of the season.
 Cincinnati Stars, a club that replaced the defunct Reds team but were expelled from the National League following their only season.
 Cincinnati Reds, the third Reds club that began in 1881 and entered the major leagues in 1882. The club survived to modern times.
 Cincinnati Outlaw Reds, a team that played in the Union Association in 1884.
 Cincinnati Kelly's Killers, a team that played in the American Association in 1891, which is called in some sources the "Cincinnati Reds"
 Cincinnati Reds (NFL), a National Football League team that played in 1933 and 1934